Abe Loewen is a Canadian Super Stock drag racer.

Loewen has won the Super Stock class eight times between 1988 (with a win at the NHRA Winternationals in Pomona, California) and 2012 (with a win at the Winternationals).

References

Dragster drivers
Living people
Year of birth missing (living people)
Place of birth missing (living people)
Canadian racing drivers
20th-century Canadian people